Estey may refer to:

 Estey (surname)
 Estey, Michigan, a civil township in Gladwin County
 Estey Hall (Philadelphia), a historic building in Philadelphia, Pennsylvania
 Estey Organ, a defunct American organ manufacturer
 Estey Tavern, a historic tavern in Middleton, Massachusetts

See also 
 Estée Lauder (disambiguation)
 
 Easty
 Eastie (disambiguation)